Wafa (Eng: Loyalty) is a Pakistani drama television series premiered on Geo Entertainment on 12 April. It is produced by Babar Javed and Asif Raza Mir under A&B Entertainment. It has Babar Ali and Mansha Pasha in lead roles.

Synopsis 
The story revolves around Wafa, who after her father's death is left alone to deal with the family debts. Daniyal, a friend of Wafa's father, sends a notice requiring her to pay back the debts or he will foreclose and sell their house. In order to sort things out, Wafa decides to meet Daniyal; however, Daniyal refuses to waive the debt. As Wafa, along with her mother and sister, continues to worry, Daniyal calls Wafa again and proposes marriage to her and in return promises to forgive the loan. Left with no choice, Wafa reluctantly agrees to marry Daniyal and starts living with him. As Wafa has married him secretly, the family does not realise the reason for Wafa's absence. The foundation of marriage between Daniyal and Wafa weakens when Saira, a previous friend of Daniyal, makes a comeback in his life.

In a series of trials and tribulations, Wafa is tested time and again, while Daniyal fails to keep Wafa happy. Will Daniyal ask Wafa to make one more sacrifice, will Wafa let go of one thing that she loves the most?

Cast
Babar Ali as Daniyal
Mansha Pasha as Wafa
Nausheen Shah as Saira
Wahaj Ali as Hashir
Maryam Effendi as Maham
Saad Qureshi as Umair
Rabia Noreen as Wafa's mother
Manzoor Qureshi as Saira's father
Rashid Farooqi as Wafa's uncle
Farah Nadir as Wafa's aunt
Mehboob Sultan as Irtaza

See also
 List of programs broadcast by Geo TV

References

External links

2016 Pakistani television series debuts
2016 Pakistani television series endings
A&B Entertainment
Geo TV original programming